Karahacılı is a Turkish place name and may refer to the following places in Turkey:

Karahacılı, Çivril
Karahacılı, Dinar, a village in Dinar district of Afyonkarahisar Province
Karahacılı, Mersin, a village in Yenişehir district of Mersin Province
Karahacılı, Silifke, a village in Silifke district of Mersin Province